The basketball competition at the 2007 Pan Arab Games was held in November. Egypt beat Jordan in the final to win the gold medal and Qatar won the third place play-off for the bronze.

Competition

Group A

 November 14, 2007
 UAE 58-72 Kuwait
 Egypt 84-42 Iraq

 November 16, 2007
 Egypt 74-64 UAE
 Kuwait 83-90 Iraq

 November 18, 2007
 Egypt 81-67 Kuwait
 UAE 87-94 Iraq

Group B

 November 15, 2007
 Saudi Arabia 59-61 Libya
 Jordan 71-53 Qatar

 November 17, 2007
 Qatar 81-61 Libya
 Jordan 64-46 Saudi Arabia

 November 19, 2007
 Libya 58-85 Jordan
 Qatar 81-67 Saudi Arabia

Knock-out stage

Semifinals
 November 20, 2007
 Iraq 75-104 Jordan
 Qatar 60-78 Egypt

The Final
 November 22, 2007
Jordan 73-76 Egypt

The 3rd/4th Place
 November 22, 2007
 Iraq 70-91 Qatar

References
 Pan Arab Games on Goalzz - Basketball

Basketball at the Pan Arab Games
basketball
International basketball competitions hosted by Egypt
2007 in African basketball
2007–08 in Asian basketball